Kanyaadaana is an Indian Kannada language soap opera which premiered on 15 November 2021 in Udaya TV. The show stars Mico Manju, Manasa Narayan, Keerthi Venkatesh, Yashaswini, Vidya Raj and Prarthana Kiran. The series is an reboot version of the Tamil  series Metti Oli which was broadcast in 2002. and is an official remake of Bengali serial Kanyadaan.

Cast

Main
Mico Manju as Ashwatha
Manasi Narayan as Archana
Keerthi Venkatesh as Bhavana
Yashaswini Ravindra as Chitra
Vidya Raj as Deepika
Prarthana Kiran as Aishwarya

Supporting
Sushmit Jain as Karthik
Deepa KN as Nirmala
Sandeep Raju
Pooja Purad
Navaneeth Gowda

Adaptations

References

2021 Indian television series debuts
Kannada-language television shows
Udaya TV original programming
Kannada-language television series based on Tamil-language television series